Bright Star may refer to:

 Bright Star (film), 2009 feature about the life of poet John Keats
 "Bright star, would I were stedfast as thou art", the sonnet from which the film takes its name
 Bright Star (musical), 2015 American musical
 Bright Star (radio), 1950s American drama series
 Bright Star, Alabama
 SS Bright Star, a Panamanian coaster
 Operation Bright Star, name given to a number of U.S. military operations
 Bright Stars FC, Ugandan football club
 Fred Murree, Pawnee professional roller skater known as Bright Star
Brightstar may refer to:
 Brightstar, Arkansas
 Brightstar Corporation, a logistics and supply chain company

See also
 Bright Star Catalogue, astronomical catalogue 
 Bright giant, a class of star
 List of brightest stars
 Kwangmyŏngsŏng program, translated as Bright Star, North Korean satellites
 Bright Star Wilderness, area in Kern County, California
 Bright Star Technology, multimedia company
 BrightStar Gold Mine, a gold mine in Western Australia